The 2011–12 Greek Volleyleague season was the 44th season of the Greek Volleyleague, the highest tier professional volley league in Greece. The winner of the league was Iraklis Thessaloniki, which beat Foinikas Syros in the league's playoff's finals. The last match of the finals didn't held because Foinikas withdrew protested for a previous match. The clubs E.A. Patras and Apollon Kalamarias were relegated to the Greek A2 League. The championship finished with only 11 team because Apollon Kalamarias withdrew in the middle of season. The MVP of the league was Andrej Kravárik, player of Iraklis.

Teams

Regular season

Source: volleyleague.gr

Play-out

Play-off (5-8) and (4-5)

Play-off (1-4)

Final standings

References

External links
Greek Volleyleague, Official Page
Greek Volleyball Federation

Volleyball competitions in Greece
2011 in Greek sport
2012 in Greek sport
2011 in volleyball
2012 in volleyball